Rudolph or Rudolf may refer to:

People 
 Rudolph (name), the given name including a list of people with the name

Religious figures 
 Rudolf of Fulda (died 865), 9th century monk, writer and theologian
 Rudolf von Habsburg-Lothringen (1788–1831), Archbishop of Olomouc and member of the House of Habsburg-Lorraine

Royalty and nobility
Rudolph I (disambiguation)
Rudolph II (disambiguation)
Rudolph III (disambiguation)
 Rudolph of France (died 936)
 Rudolph I of Germany (1218–1291)
 Rudolf II, Holy Roman Emperor (1552–1612)
 Rudolph, Prince of Anhalt-Zerbst (1576–1621)
 Rudolf, Crown Prince of Austria (1858–1889), son and heir of Emperor Franz Joseph I of Austria and Empress Elisabeth of Austria (died at Mayerling)

Places 
 Rudolph Glacier, Antarctica
 Rudolph, South Dakota, US
 Rudolph, Wisconsin, US, a village
 Rudolph (town), Wisconsin, adjacent to the village
 Rudolf Island, northernmost island of Europe
 Lake Rudolf, now Lake Turkana, in Kenya

Art, entertainment, and media

Fictional entities
 Rudolph the Red-Nosed Reindeer, one of Santa Claus's reindeer
 Rudolph Farnsworth, a minor villain in the television series Kim Possible 
 Rudolph, alternate name for Gossamer, a Looney Tunes character
 Rudolph Reed, the protagonist of Gwendolyn Brooks' poem "The Ballad of Rudolph Reed", published in Selected Poems (1963)  
 Rudolf Ushiromiya, a character in the visual novel, manga, and anime series Umineko no Naku Koro ni

fr:Rodolphe
ja:ルドルフ